Snæfellsjökull (snow-fell glacier) is a 700,000-year-old glacier-capped stratovolcano in western Iceland. It is situated on the westernmost part of the Snæfellsnes peninsula in Iceland. Sometimes it may be seen from the city of Reykjavík over Faxa Bay, at a distance of 120 km.

The mountain is one of the most famous sites of Iceland, primarily due to the novel Journey to the Center of the Earth (1864) by Jules Verne, in which the protagonists find the entrance to a passage leading to the center of the earth on Snæfellsjökull.

The mountain is included in the Snæfellsjökull National Park (Icelandic: Þjóðgarðurinn Snæfellsjökull).

Snæfellsjökull was visible from an extreme distance due to an arctic mirage on July 17, 1939. Captain Robert Bartlett of the Effie M. Morrissey sighted Snæfellsjökull from a position some  distant.

In August 2012, the summit was ice-free for the first time in recorded history.

Geology

The stratovolcano, which is the only large central volcano in its part of Iceland, has many pyroclastic cones on its flanks. Upper-flank craters produced intermediate to felsic materials, while lower-flank craters produced basaltic lava flows. Several holocene eruptions have originated from the summit crater and have produced felsic material. The eruption was explosive and originated from the summit crater, and may have produced lava flows.

Climbing 
In summer, the saddle near the summit can be reached easily by walking, although the glacier's crevasses must be avoided. Several tour companies run regular guided walks during the season. To reach the true summit requires technical ice climbing.

In culture

Literature
Snæfellsjökull serves as the entrance to the subterranean journey in Jules Verne's classic science fiction novel, Journey to the Center of the Earth (1864). It is also featured in the 1960s Blind Birds trilogy by Czech SF writer Ludvík Souček, loosely inspired by Verne's work. While trying to discern whether Jules Verne actually visited Iceland, a Czechoslovak-Icelandic science party discovers an ancient alien outpost in the cave system under Snæfellsjökull.

It also figures prominently in the novel Under the Glacier (1968) by Icelandic Nobel laureate Halldór Laxness.

Radio and podcasting
Snæfellsjökull is the setting and subject of "Lava and Ice" (episode 2) of Wireless Nights, Jarvis Cocker's BBC Radio 4 and podcast series.

See also

 Geography of Iceland
 Glaciers of Iceland
 Iceland plume
 List of lakes of Iceland
 List of islands off Iceland
 List of national parks of Iceland
 List of volcanoes in Iceland
 List of rivers of Iceland
 Volcanism of Iceland
 Waterfalls of Iceland

References

Additional sources

External links 
 The website of Snæfellsjökull National Park
 Snæfellsjökull in the Catalogue of Icelandic Volcanoes
 Snæfellsjökull The Jewel of West Iceland

Mountains of Iceland
Stratovolcanoes of Iceland
Western Region (Iceland)
National parks of Iceland
Jules Verne
Active volcanoes
Snæfellsnes
Subglacial volcanoes of Iceland
One-thousanders of Iceland
Glaciers of Iceland
Volcanic systems of Iceland
Snæfellsnes Volcanic Belt
Calderas of Iceland
Central volcanoes of Iceland
Pleistocene stratovolcanoes
Holocene stratovolcanoes